Josie Green (born 25 April 1993) is a Welsh professional footballer who plays for Leicester City in the Women's Super League.

Early life 
Green was born in Hemel Hempstead, on 25 April 1993, to parents Clive and Liz.

Club career

Watford 
Green started her career at Watford F.C. Ladies and made her first appearance during the 2010/11 FA Women's National League season. In February 2016 she left 2nd division Watford for 3rd division Tottenham Hotspur and featured for her new club in the second half of their 2015–16 season. Green stated years later that she left Watford for Spurs due to not enjoying football at that point in her playing career.

Tottenham Hotspur 
Green's first full season with Spurs was one of their most successful, with Spurs winning a quadruple including promotion to the semi-professional FA Women's Super League 2. She continued to feature in a majority of matches for the team in the following seasons including starting in 15 out of 20 matches in the 2018–19 FA Women's Championship season at the end of which Spurs won promotion to the top flight and fully professional FA Women's Super League. Josie signed her first professional contract with Spurs prior to the club's inaugural 2019–20 FA WSL and in June 2020 re-signed with the club through 2022. In August 2020, prior to Spurs' second top flight season, Green was named as the team's new captain after the retirement of longtime captain Jenna Schillaci. Green had served as vice-captain during the 2019–20 WSL season.

International career 
Green was born in England, but she qualifies for Wales internationally through her grandfather, who was born in Pontypool.

Her first senior cap came on 21 August 2010 when she was used as a substitute in a 2011 Women's World Cup qualification match vs Azerbaijan She was only 16 at the time of the match and so her appearances shifted to the Wales U19 squad through 2011 and she returned for a stint with the senior national team in 2014. After 2014 she declined call ups in order to spend more time with her family, most notably her father who was dealing with illness. She was brought back into the senior team fold for an October 2018 training camp and on 29 August 2019, Green earned her first cap in five years in a UEFA Women's Euro 2022 qualifying match vs Faroe Islands.

Honours
Tottenham Hotspur
 FA Women's Premier League: Championship Play-off Winner: 2016–17
 FA Women's Premier League Southern Division: 2016–17

References 

Welsh women's footballers
Living people
1993 births
Tottenham Hotspur F.C. Women players
Watford F.C. Women players
Wales women's international footballers
Women's association football midfielders